Natchez On-Top-of-the-Hill Historic District is a historic district in Natchez, Mississippi that was listed on the National Register of Historic Places in 1979.

Important sites within the district include:
the location of Andrew Marschalk's printing office, where the first book printed in Mississippi was printed in 1799, 
the first bank in Mississippi, 
the site of American flag-raising, in 1798, by Andrew Ellicott near the House on Ellicott's Hill, and
the traditional location of the earliest Sunday school south of Philadelphia, conducted at a Methodist church.

Architecturally, the district includes a set of Greek Revival works that are of national-level significance, and many other styles including Late Victorian architecture.  It has what is assessed to be the best Swiss Chalet Style work in Mississippi and it also has the best residential French Second Empire style work in Mississippi.

It includes National Historic Landmark-designated sites:
House on Ellicott's Hill
Stanton Hall
Rosalie
and other sites individually listed on the National Register:
King's Tavern
Winchester House (1835)
Williamsburg, NRHP-listed as John Bayton House
Prentiss Club (1904), 211 N. Pearl St., a yellow brick building in Second Renaissance Revival style, designed by New Orleans architects Soule and McDonald
Stratton Chapel of the First Presbyterian Church
First Presbyterian Church
Magnolia Hall, NRHP-listed as Henderson-Britton House.
The Elms, c.1805
Green Leaves, 303 S. Rankin St, 1838, Greek Revival with Doric columns

Presbyterian Manse, circa 1830
William Johnson House (1841) Greek Revival
Choctaw (c.1835), NRHP-listed as Neibert-Fisk House
Longwood
Melrose

Glen Auburn, 300 S Commerce St, built by Christian Schwartz, circa 1875, described as "probably the most outstanding of the post-Civil War houses" in the district and as "the best example of the Second Empire style in the state of Mississippi."

One of the district's "pivotal" contributing buildings is the Adams County Courthouse at 201 S. Wall Street, which was built c. 1820 as a two-story Federal-style brick courthouse with a cupola.  It was remodeled c. 1920 into Colonial Revival style with classical porticos. 
Commercial Bank and Banker's House (c. 1837), a National Historic Landmark consisting of the Commercial Bank Building, a "one-story three-bay stuccoed brick with stone facade commercial building of two-story height with Ionic portico" and the connected Greek Revival style . Andrew Brown, builder.

The Barnes House, circa 1836

A map delineating the area of the district, including a rectangle defined by Monroe, Pine, Orleans, and Broadway, but also a bit more, is provided in its 1979 NRHP nomination document.

See also
There are several other NRHP-listed historic districts in Natchez:
Downriver Residential Historic District, adjacent on the south below Orleans St.
Natchez Bluffs and Under-the-Hill Historic District, adjacent to the river side
Upriver Residential District, adjacent on the north, above Monroe St.
Holy Family Catholic Church Historic District, adjacent, on the west
Clifton Heights Historic District, on the river side of the Upriver Residential District
Cemetery Bluff District
Woodlawn Historic District

References

Historic districts in Natchez, Mississippi
Greek Revival architecture in Mississippi
Victorian architecture in Mississippi
Historic districts on the National Register of Historic Places in Mississippi
National Register of Historic Places in Natchez, Mississippi